The Janadhipathi Police Weeratha Padakkama ("President's Police Gallantry Medal") is awarded to police officers in Sri Lanka for gallantry or brave performance of duty. It is awarded by the President of Sri Lanka on the recommendations of the Inspector General of Police (IGP). The medal replaced the Queen's Police Medal which was awarded until Ceylon became a Republic in 1972.

See also
 Awards and decorations of the Sri Lanka Police
 Queen's Police Medal

References

External links
Sri Lanka Police

Civil awards and decorations of Sri Lanka
Law enforcement awards and honors
Courage awards
Awards established in 1972